José Franco Gómez (born 26 December 1988), commonly known as Regino, is a Spanish footballer who plays for UD Los Barrios. Mainly a right back, he can also play as a central defender or a defensive midfielder.

Club career
Born in San Fernando, Cádiz, Regino joined Sevilla FC's youth setup in 2005, after already making his debut as a senior with UD San Fernando. In 2009, after two full seasons at CD San Fernando, he moved to Sevilla's fierce rivals Real Betis and was assigned to the reserves in Segunda División B.

Regino left the Verdiblancos in June 2011, after being linked to Segunda División club Recreativo de Huelva. The move never materialised, and he subsequently joined Jerez CF of Tercera División. On 31 January of the following year, he signed for San Fernando CD also in the fourth tier.

On 13 March 2012, Regino moved abroad for the first time in his career, signing with Thai Premier League side BEC Tero Sanana FC. In 2013 he switched teams and countries again, joining Kedah FA from Malaysia.

On 31 August 2015, Regino moved to Cypriot Second Division club Olympiakos Nicosia. After returning to his country, he continued to compete exclusively in the lower leagues.

References

External links

Beticopedia profile 

1988 births
Living people
People from San Fernando, Cádiz
Sportspeople from the Province of Cádiz
Spanish footballers
Footballers from Andalusia
Association football defenders
Association football midfielders
Association football utility players
Segunda División B players
Tercera División players
CD San Fernando players
Betis Deportivo Balompié footballers
CD Ebro players
Xerez Deportivo FC footballers
UD Los Barrios footballers
Thai League 1 players
Police Tero F.C. players
Malaysia Super League players
Kedah Darul Aman F.C. players
Cypriot Second Division players
Olympiakos Nicosia players
Spanish expatriate footballers
Expatriate footballers in Thailand
Expatriate footballers in Malaysia
Expatriate footballers in Cyprus
Spanish expatriate sportspeople in Thailand
Spanish expatriate sportspeople in Malaysia
Spanish expatriate sportspeople in Cyprus